Nicholas Theodore Varopoulos (Nikolaos Varopoulos, also Nicolas Varopoulos; born 16 June 1940) is a Greek mathematician, who works on harmonic analysis and especially analysis on Lie groups.

Varopoulos is the son of the Thessaloniki mathematics professor Theodore Varopoulos (1894–1957). Nicholas Varopoulos received his PhD in 1965 from Cambridge University under John Hunter Williamson. There he was in 1965 a lecturer in mathematics. In the academic year 1966–1967 he was at the Institute for Advanced Study in Princeton, New Jersey. Varopoulos became a professor at the Université Pierre et Marie Curie (Université Paris VI).

In 1968 Varopoulos became the first recipient of the Salem Prize. In 1990 he was an invited speaker at the International Congress of Mathematicians in Kyoto (Analysis and geometry on groups) and in 1970 in Nice (Groupes des fonctions continues en analyse harmoniques). His doctoral students include Thomas William Körner and Laurent Saloff-Coste.

Publications
 
 with D. L. Salinger: 
 
 
 
 
 
 
 
 
 with Laurent Saloff-Coste, Thierry Coulhon: Analysis and Geometry on Groups. Cambridge University Press, 1992

See also
 Varopoulos's theorem in isoperimetry

References

External links
 

20th-century Greek mathematicians
1940 births
Living people